José Luis Álvarez (born 22 January 1969) is a Spanish fencer. He competed in the individual and team sabre events at the 1992 Summer Olympics.

References

External links
 

1969 births
Living people
Spanish male sabre fencers
Olympic fencers of Spain
Fencers at the 1992 Summer Olympics
Fencers from Madrid